Hołowienki  is a village in the administrative district of Gmina Sabnie, within Sokołów County, Masovian Voivodeship, in east-central Poland.

Notable people
Kazimierz Romaniuk (born 1927), Polish bishop, bishop of Warszawa-Praga

References

Villages in Sokołów County